Maple liqueur refers to various alcoholic products made from maple syrup, primarily in the Northeast United States and Canada. It is most commonly made by mixing Canadian rye whiskey and Canadian maple syrup. Maple liqueur is considered an important cultural beverage in certain Canadian festivals.

In Canadian French, such a product is known as eau de vie d'érable.

History 

Maple liqueur is considered to be a traditional part of Canadian cuisine, in part because of its components being Canadian whisky and Canadian maple syrup. Both of these components have their own unique history in Canadian cuisine. Notably, maple syrup has also been used in maple sap beer in areas such as Vermont. The process of mixing alcohol with maple syrup has been practiced traditionally in Canada for an extended period of time, and distilleries make their maple liqueur with these same processes.

Canadian maple syrup 

The production of maple syrup was practiced by First Nations people in North America, long before Europeans arrived in Canada. First Nations people would collect maple sap in the process of curing meat. The practice of sap collection later was learned by Canadian settlers, who boiled the sap to produce maple syrup. Often, settlers would bore taps into the trees and place a collection bucket underneath it to collect sap. The maple leaf is on the Canadian flag and is a symbol of Canadian culture. As well, Agriculture Canada states that maple syrup continues to be introduced into liqueur blends. Modern collecting methods use tubing, connecting multiple maple trees together. The sap is then collected in a storage tank and evaporated using an evaporator. The basic process has not changed, although modern equipments and methods as stated before are now used. In total, Canada produces 71% of the world's pure maple syrup, and 91% of that is produced primarily in Quebec.

Canadian whisky 

Canadian whisky is described as a grain spirit that has been aged in charred oak barrels for at least three years. The practice originated from Scottish settlers, who brought over their practice from overseas. The primary ingredient is corn, but rye is important as it adds its own distinctive flavor. Currently, there are many brands of Canadian whisky available. Whisky tends to have an alcohol content of around 40%-50%, although this can be increased by means of distillation.

Production 

Maple liqueur is not commonly found in liquor stores as it is easy to make at home. The production process is simple and does not require any special equipment.  Homemade maple liqueur is both easy to make and inexpensive. It can be enjoyed on its own, in coffee, or in a variety of cocktails.

Ingredients needed are some kind of liquor to use as a base, usually rye whiskey. The only other ingredient needed to make maple liqueur is pure maple syrup. Table syrup cannot be used as it is often made with high fructose corn syrup and artificial flavouring instead of real maple. Maple syrup comes in different grades, with the grade of a syrup being determined by its colour, clarity, density, and intensity of maple flavour is. As the sap harvesting season progresses, the maple syrup that is produced becomes darker and more caramel in colour. These darker syrups also tend to have the most intense maple flavour, compared to the lighter taste of syrup produced early in the season. Darker syrups create a more intense maple flavour in the liqueur as well and because of this are often preferred when producing maple liqueur. The darker the syrup that is used, the more intense and full bodied the resulting liqueur will taste.

The process of making maple liqueur is simple. Equal parts rye whiskey and maple syrup are combined in a sealable mason jar, mixed thoroughly and then left to sit in the refrigerator for at least two weeks. Other spices and ingredients can be added to give different flavors to the liqueur, such as glycerin, honey, or brown sugar. As is with standard aging processes, generally, the longer the liqueur is left to age, the better the final product. After this, the liqueur is ready to be consumed.

As mentioned previously, commercially produced maple liqueurs are not very common due to how easy the liqueur is to make at home. They have started to increase in popularity in the early 2010s with Crown Royal, a popular whiskey brand, releasing its Crown Royal Maple Finished whiskey in 2013. Varieties other than whiskey also exist, with cream liqueurs being the second most common type. Examples such as Cabot Trail Maple Cream consist of pure maple syrup added to different combinations of rum, grain alcohols, and in this case fresh cream. Sortilège is another popular Canadian brand based in Montreal that produces three distinct varieties of maple liqueurs: Sortilège Whisky, Sortilège Prestige, and Sortilège Cream.

Usage and consumption 

As with all alcoholic beverages, maple liqueur can often be mixed with other beverages for cocktails, and also goes well in coffee.

Beverages

Canadian immigrant 
This shooter consists of equal portions of Kahlúa, butterscotch liqueur, and maple liqueur. Usually, these ingredients are mixed in a large shooter glass, and then chased with warm maple syrup.

The waffler 
This drink is a favorite at the Massachusetts College of Liberal Arts. Simply, a teaspoon of maple syrup is put in first, coating the sides of the glass. Then maple liqueur and Bailey's Irish Cream are added in a shot glass at a 1.5:1 ratio respectively. If done properly, Bailey's Irish Cream should form a layer on top, similarly to other shooters, such as a buttery nipple.

Coffee 
Often, coffee can be served in conjunction with Bailey's Irish Cream or Kahlua. As a more culturally Canadian practice, maple liqueur can be used instead to provide smooth sweet maple tones.

Maple cream

Also known as maple butter, is a dairy less and all-naturally cream made by adding invertase to increase concentration. It is made of 1.5 oz. Maple liqueur and 1 oz. Vanilla Vodka, 4 oz. Vanilla ice cream, 1 scoop of ice, and a dash of maple syrup. The ingredients are evaporated, quickly cooled, stirred and then packaged at room temperature. The process increases the concentration of ingredients to produce a light colored with a smooth, creamy texture cream. Some common uses include as a spread on toast, bagels, muffins, pancakes, doughnuts and other baked goods.

Negus

This is a warm cocktail made of a mixture of 3 shots Port, 1 shot lemon juice, shot Sugar Maple Liqueur, topped with hot water. Garnish with Nutmeg, dust and drink in a Toddy Glass.

Maple cream ale

Favoured by Canadians for its refreshing peppermint flavour. It is made of 1.5 oz. Maple liqueur, 4 oz. Cream ale soda, ice, topped with a sprig of mint.

Notable brands 
 Sortilège, with their whiskey, prestige, and cream varieties.
 Crown Royal Maple finished whiskey (2013)
 Cabot Trail Maple Cream
 Tap 357 - Maple Rye Whisky

See also

 List of foods made from maple

References

Food made from maple
Liqueurs
Canadian alcoholic drinks